The Bharatiya Janata Party, or simply,  BJP Tripura (BJP;), 
is the state unit of the Bharatiya Janata Party of the Tripura. Its head office is situated at 12-A, Krishnanagar Main Road, (In between Advisor & Bijoy Kumar Chowmuhani), Po.Agartala(Main), Dist.West Tripura-799 001, Tripura, India. The current president of BJP Tripura is Rajiv Bhattacharjee .

Lok Sabha Members

Rajya Sabha Members

In General Election

In State Election

In Local Elections

Municipal corporation election results

Autonomous District Council election

2021 Tripura local elections
In 2021 local election BJP won 329 seats of 334 at various municipal council and one municipal corporation, with vote percentage of 59.01%.

2015 Tripura local elections
In 2015 local election BJP won 2 seats of 310 at various municipal council and one municipal corporation.

Legislative leaders

Chief ministers

Deputy chief minister

See also
Biplab Kumar Deb
Manik Saha
Bharatiya Janata Party
National Democratic Alliance
North East Democratic Alliance
Indigenous People's Front of Tripura

Notes

References

Tripura
Political parties in Tripura